Sar Darreh (also known as Avval Darvāzeh) is a village in Oshnavieh-ye Jonubi Rural District, Nalus District, Oshnavieh County, West Azerbaijan Province, Iran. At the 2006 census, its population was 302, in 40 families.

References 

Populated places in Oshnavieh County